Cayo Santiago, also known as Santiago Island, Isla de los monos (or Island of the monkeys), is located at ,   to the east of Punta Santiago, Humacao, Puerto Rico.

Geography
Six hundred meters west of the southernmost point is a shoal, Bajo Evelyn, which has a shallow depth of 8 fathoms.

In the late 1940s, the island was expropriated by Puerto Rico from its private owners and ceded to the University of Puerto Rico. Only researchers are allowed on the island, but tourists can charter a boat to view the island and its primate inhabitants.

Resident Taxa
Since December 1938, the island has been home to a free-ranging population of rhesus macaques. Today, the island is inhabited by descendants of the original founder population of 409 individuals. Founder individuals were imported from India by Clarence R. Carpenter and the School of Tropical Medicine in San Juan that was operated by Columbia University College of Physicians and Surgeons and the University of Puerto Rico. Today, the colony, which numbers over one thousand animals, serves as a research resource supported by the National Institutes of Health and the University of Puerto Rico Caribbean Primate Research Center for investigators from many institutions in the US and several in Europe. A pictorial history on the 75 years of the colony was recently published. 

Gallery

References

External links

Cayo Santiago & The Origins NIH NPRC Program with Hurricane Maria of 9/20/2017 update
Video about the monkeys on Cayo Santiago
Caribbean Primate Research Center
University of Puerto Rico page
Primate Research Center

Humacao, Puerto Rico
Uninhabited islands of Puerto Rico